Eremobia ochroleuca, the dusky sallow, is a moth of the family Noctuidae. It is found in Central and Southern Europe and the Middle East.

Technical description and variation

E. ochroleuca Esp. (41b). Forewing white, suffused with pale olive brown; lines broadly white, the  inner and outer generally coalescing on submedian fold, the outer line denticulate externally; median area often darker brown, somewhat blackish tinged, especially in the male; orbicular stigma pale olive, the reniform white with an ochreous centre: submarginal line whitish, indented on each fold and there preceded by some dark brown scaling; a row of dark marginal lunules; fringe ochreous with two outer rows of dark lunules; hindwing ochreous dusted with luteous grey; a dark cell spot and outer line followed by a pale space before the broad fuscous marginal border; fringe white. — Larva pale green; lines whitish; lateral line broadly white, its lower edge blackish; spiracles black: head pale brown; the tubercles blackish.

The wingspan is 34–37 mm.

Biology
The larvae feed on various grasses, primarily Dactylis glomerata.
first on the leaves, later devouring the seeds.

References

External links

Dusky Sallow on UKmoths
Fauna Europaea
Lepiforum.de
Vlindernet.nl 

Hadeninae
Moths of Europe
Moths of Asia
Taxa named by Michael Denis
Taxa named by Ignaz Schiffermüller